The 2020 United States presidential election in Oklahoma was held on Tuesday, November 3, 2020, as part of the 2020 United States presidential election in which all 50 states plus the District of Columbia participated. Oklahoma voters chose electors to represent them in the Electoral College via a popular vote, pitting the Republican Party's nominee, incumbent President Donald Trump, and running mate Vice President Mike Pence against Democratic Party nominee, former Vice President Joe Biden, and his running mate California Senator Kamala Harris. Oklahoma has seven electoral votes in the Electoral College.

Trump easily carried Oklahoma on Election Day by a margin of 33.08%, down from 36.39 points in 2016. Oklahoma was one of two states where Trump won every county, the other being West Virginia. This also signaled the fifth consecutive election in which the Republican candidate carried every county in the state, including those counties encompassed by Native American reservations. In this election, Trump also became the first presidential candidate ever to win more than a million votes in Oklahoma. Biden, however, came within 3,326 votes of winning Oklahoma's most populous county Oklahoma County, and won more than 40% of the vote in Oklahoma's second-most populous county Tulsa. No Democratic presidential candidate has won Oklahoma County since Lyndon B. Johnson in his 1964 landslide, or Tulsa County since Franklin D. Roosevelt in his 1936 landslide. This is the first election since 2000 in which not every county voted in the majority for the Republican. However, these gains in urban Oklahoma were offset by continued falloff in southeast Oklahoma, where Biden even underperformed Hillary Clinton's performance four years earlier in most counties.

Per exit polls by the Associated Press, Trump's strength in Oklahoma came from Southern whites, with 71% support. Oklahoma, often termed the "Buckle of the Bible Belt", is a very religious state, with Trump capturing the Protestant vote by 78%. Trump also exhibited considerable strength in the socially conservative but economically liberal area known as "Little Dixie", which historically votes Democratic at the local level, carrying Oklahoma's 2nd congressional district, which encompasses this region and its sizable conservative Native American population, by 54%.

Primary elections
The primary elections were held on Super Tuesday, March 3, 2020.

Republican primary
Donald Trump and Bill Weld were among the declared Republican candidates.

Democratic primary
Bernie Sanders, Elizabeth Warren, and former Vice President Joe Biden were the major declared Democratic candidates.

Libertarian nominee

Jo Jorgensen, Psychology Senior Lecturer at Clemson University

Independent candidates
Three unaffiliated candidates filed to be on the Oklahoma presidential ballot, all by paying a $35,000 fee. Green Party candidate Howie Hawkins has filed a lawsuit challenging the amount of the filing fee.
 Jade Simmons, concert artist, speaker, and author
 Brock Pierce, cryptocurrency entrepreneur and former child actor
 Kanye West, musician

Ballot order
Oklahoma determines ballot order by lot, with unaffiliated candidates listed below candidates of recognized parties. The drawing was held on July 16, with the resulting order for political parties being Republican, Libertarian, Democrat. The unaffiliated candidates for president will be listed in this order: Jade Simmons, Kanye West, Brock Pierce.

General election

Predictions

Polling

Graphical summary

Aggregate polls

Polls

Donald Trump vs. Bernie Sanders

Donald Trump vs. Pete Buttigieg

Donald Trump vs. Generic Democrat

Results

Results by county

By congressional district

Trump won all of Oklahoma's congressional districts.

Electors
 Republican Party electors
Ronda Vuillemont-Smith, Lonnie Lu Anderson, Chris Martin, Steve Fair, Linda Huggard, A. J. Ferate, Carolyn McLarty

 Libertarian Party electors
Erin Adams, Danny Chabino, Drew Cook, Kevin Hobbie, Rex Lawhorn, Jay Norton, Victoria Whitfield

 Democratic Party electors
Judy Eason McIntyre, Eric Proctor, Jeff Berrong, Christine Byrd, Demetrios Bereolos, Pamela Iron, Shevonda Steward

 Electors for Jade Simmons
Shanda Carter, Terrence Stephens, Hope Stephens, Elizabeth Stephens, Dakota Hooks, Phalanda Boyd, Quincy Boyd

 Electors for Kanye West
April Anderson, Craig Alan Weygandt, Will Flanagan, Tom Krup, Megan Krup, Gretchen Schrupp, David Schrupp

 Electors for Brock Pierce
Robert Murphy, Susan Darlene Murphy, Richard Prawdzienski, Jessy Artman, David Selinger, Shane Wayne Howell, Angela McCaslin

Notes

Partisan clients

See also
 United States presidential elections in Oklahoma
 Presidency of Joe Biden
 2020 United States presidential election
 2020 Democratic Party presidential primaries
 2020 Libertarian Party presidential primaries
 2020 Republican Party presidential primaries
 2020 United States elections

References

External links
 
 
  (state affiliate of the U.S. League of Women Voters)
 

Oklahoma
2020
Presidential